Adur may refer to:

Places
 Adur, Anekal, a village in the southern state of Karnataka, India
 Adur, Azerbaijan, a village in the Quba Rayon
 Adur, Bangalore South, a village in the southern state of Karnataka, India
 Adur, Haveri, a village in the southern state of Karnataka, India
 Adur, Iran, a village in Kohgiluyeh and Boyer-Ahmad Province, Iran
 Adur, Shimoga, a village in the southern state of Karnataka, India
 Adur District, England
 River Adur, England

Other uses
Anthony Adur (born 1987), Trinidad and Tobago footballer
 The Middle Persian word for Atar, the Zoroastrian concept of holy fire